Empyelocera is a genus of ulidiid or picture-winged fly in the family Ulidiidae.

Species
Empyelocera abstersa
Empyelocera amoena
Empyelocera anomala
Empyelocera berlandi
Empyelocera camillae
Empyelocera dimidiata
Empyelocera melanorrhina
Empyelocera nasuta
Empyelocera nigriceps
Empyelocera nigrimana
Empyelocera nitida
Empyelocera xanthaspis
Empyelocera xanthostoma

References

 
Ulidiidae